David Leonard Roberts (June 30, 1933 – October 3, 2021) was a Panamanian Major League Baseball first baseman who played 22 seasons of professional baseball. Of all professional baseball players whose careers began in 1952 only Hank Aaron had a longer career.

Minor leagues
He was purchased by the St. Louis Browns on October 10, 1953, less than a month before the Browns would officially become the Baltimore Orioles. It was to be the last transaction made in St. Louis Browns franchise history. After a strong 1955 season in Class AA ball playing first base opposite Brooks Robinson at third for the San Antonio Missions in the Texas League, Roberts was demoted back to Class A ball in 1957 when another Texas league team refused to play against any team with black players.
Roberts ended his American professional baseball career with the Columbus Jets in 1966.

Major League
Roberts' Major League career was uneventful. Between stints with the Oklahoma City 89ers, he collected just 178 at bats with Houston, playing mostly first base, but also some outfield. In 1966, he got one final shot at the majors with the Pittsburgh Pirates, but went just 2-for-16 and was out of the majors for good.

Japanese leagues
In , Roberts made his way to the Sankei Atoms of the Japanese Central League. He made the all star team in 1968 and became the first gaijin to hit 40 home runs. He was an all-star in 1969, 1971 and 1972. In 1971, he set the record for home runs by a gaijin at 145. He played for them until , when he lost his job to the newly signed Joe Pepitone. (Pepitone lasted 14 games. His name came to be used to mean "goof off" in Japanese vernacular). Roberts played one more season for the Kintetsu Buffaloes before retiring.

References

External links
, or Pura Pelota, or Retrosheet

1933 births
2021 deaths
Aberdeen Pheasants players
Austin Senators players
Cardenales de Lara players
Panamanian expatriate baseball players in Venezuela
Columbus Jets players
Dallas Rangers players
Grand Forks Chiefs players
Houston Buffs players
Houston Colt .45s players
Jacksonville Jets players
Kintetsu Buffaloes players
Knoxville Smokies players
Louisville Colonels (minor league) players
Major League Baseball center fielders
Major League Baseball first basemen
Major League Baseball left fielders
Major League Baseball players from Panama
Major League Baseball right fielders
Oklahoma City 89ers players
Panamanian expatriate baseball players in Japan
Panamanian expatriate baseball players in the United States
Sportspeople from Panama City
Pittsburgh Pirates players
Porterville Comets players
Sacramento Solons players
San Antonio Missions players
Sankei Atoms players
Tiburones de La Guaira players
Vancouver Mounties players
Yakult Atoms players
Panamanian expatriate baseball players in Canada